Stanbic Bank Uganda Limited (SBU) is a commercial bank in Uganda and is licensed by the Bank of Uganda, the national banking regulator.

Overview
SBU is the largest commercial bank in the country, by assets. As of 31 December 2021, the bank's total assets were valued at USh8.713 trillion (US$2.452 billion). At that time shareholders' equity was valued at USh1.483 trillion (US$417.5 million). In June 2018, Fitch Rating Agency gave Stanbic Bank Uganda a AAA rating with a Stable outlook.

Group
SBU is listed on the Uganda Securities Exchange (USE), where it trades under the symbol SBU. It offers a range of banking products including Internet banking, mobile money, SME lending, and debit and credit cards, among other products. SBU is a subsidiary of Stanbic Africa Holdings Limited, which is in turn owned by Standard Bank Group Limited.

History
The bank was founded in Uganda as the National Bank of India in 1906. After several name changes, it became Grindlays Bank. In 1991, Standard Bank bought the Grindlays Bank network in Africa. The new owners renamed the bank Stanbic Bank (Uganda) Limited.

Stanbic Bank (Uganda) Limited is licensed as a merchant banker, stockbroker, and financial adviser by the Capital Markets Authority, which licensed the USE in 1997. In 2017 the bank was awarded a bancassurance licence from the Insurance Regulatory Authority, authorizing Stanbic Bank to sell insurance products to its customers and the public.

In February 2002, Standard Bank acquired 90 percent shareholding in the Uganda Commercial Bank, a government-owned retail banking operation with 65 branches. The new owners merged their new acquisition with their existing Stanbic Bank (Uganda) Limited to form Uganda's largest commercial bank by assets and branch network. In November 2005, the government of Uganda divested its ownership in Stanbic Bank (Uganda) by listing its shares on the USE. Standard Bank also floated 10 percent of its shareholding at the same time, reducing their ownership to 80 percent.

On 19 February 2018, SBU informed its shareholders of the Board of Directors’ decision to re-organize the company’s corporate structure and operations through the formation of a group with a holding company to be called ‘Stanbic Uganda Holdings Limited’ owning several subsidiaries engaged in different lines of businesses including a new banking Subsidiary which effectively began on 28 November 2018.

Ownership
, the ownership of SBU stock,  was as depicted in the table below:

Governance
The chairman of the board is Japheth Katto. Anne Juuko is the managing director.

Branch network
As of December 2017, SBU had a branch network of nearly 70 branches and 10 customers service points in all four regions of the country. Its network was the largest of all commercial banks in Uganda. At that time, it maintained 173 networked automated teller machines. Listed below were some of the branches of the bank:

 Busia Branch: 1 Tororo Road, Tororo
 Iganga Branch: 1-3 Magumba Road, Iganga
 Jinja Branch: 2 Martin Road, Jinja
 Kamuli Branch: 2 Gabula Road, Kamuli
 Kapchorwa Branch: 20 Kitale Road, Kapchorwa
 Kotido Branch: 3A Moroto Road, Kotido 
 Lugazi Branch: 29 Ntege Road, Lugazi
 Mbale Branch: 50/52 Republic Avenue, Mbale
 Moroto Branch: 27 Lira Road, Moroto
 Soroti Branch: 42 Gweri Road, Soroti
 Tororo Branch: 1 Block 5 Uhuru Drive, Tororo
 Aponye Mall Branch: 8 Burton Street, Aponye Mall, Kampala
 Kawempe Branch: 161 Bombo Road, Kawempe
 Kiboga Branch: 100 Block 634 Kilulumba, Kampala–Hoima Road Kiboga
 Kireka Branch: 319 Block 232 Kampala–Jinja Highway, Kireka
 Kyambogo Branch: Kyambogo University Campus, Kyambogo
 Luweero Branch: 440 Block 652 Kampala–Gulu Highway, Luweero
 Mityana Branch: 54 Block 425 Katakara Road, Mityana
 Mpigi Branch: Mpigi Town
 Mukono Branch: 37/39 Kampala–Jinja Highway, Mukono
 Mulago Branch: 2nd Floor, Mulago National Referral Hospital, Mulago Hill, Kampala
 Nakivubo Branch: 58 William Street, Kampala
 Nateete Branch: 643 Block 18 Kampala–Masaka Road, Nateete
 Wandegeya Branch: 220 Bombo Road, Wandegeya, Kampala
 William Street Branch: 6 William Street, Kampala
 Bugoloobi Branch: Village Mall, Corner of Spring Road & Bandari Rise, Bugoloobi, Kampala
 Entebbe Main Branch: 15 Entebbe–Kampala Road, Entebbe
 Forest Mall Branch: 3A2 & 3A3 Lugogo Bypass Road, Lugogo, Kampala.
 Freedom City Branch: Freedom City Mall, 4010 Entebbe Road, Namasuba, Kampala 
 Garden City Branch: 64-86 Yusuf Lule Road, Kampala 
 Kabalagala Branch: 1188-1190 Embassy Plaza, Ggaba Road, Kabalagala, Kampala
 Corporate Branch: 18 Hannington Road, Kampala
 Lugogo Branch: Shop Number 5, 2-8 Lugogo Bypass Road, Lugogo, Kampala
 Makerere Branch: Senate Building,  Makerere University Campus, Makerere Hill, Kampala
 Kampala Metro Branch: Social Security House, 4 Jinja Road, Kampala
 Nakasero Branch: Umoja Building, 20 Nakasero Road, Nakasero Hill, Kampala
 Nakawa Branch: M193/194 Industrial Area Road, Nakawa, Kampala 
 Ntinda Branch: 3798 Block 216 Ntinda Trading Centre, Kampala
 Adjumani Branch: 9 Mangi Road, Adjumani
 Apac Branch: 18 Akokoro Road, Apac
 Arua Branch: 25 Avenue Road, Arua
 Gulu Branch: 2&4 Acholi Road, Gulu
 Kigumba Branch: 18 Kampala-Gulu Highway, Kigumba
 Kitgum Branch: 4/6 Philip Adonga Road, Kitgum 
 Lira Branch: 2 Soroti Road, Lira
 Moyo Branch: 1 Kerere Crescent Road, Moyo
 Nebbi Branch: Arua Road, Nebbi Trading Centre
 Buliisa Branch: Buliisa–Paara Road, Buliisa
 Bundibugyo Branch: 4 Block A Bundibugyo Road,  Bundibugyo Township 
 Bwamiramira Branch: 18 Karuguza Road, Bwamiramira Trading Centre, Kibaale District
 Fort Portal Branch: 21 Lugard Road, Fort Portal
 Hoima Branch: 32 Main Street, Hoima
 Ibanda Branch: 10-12 Kamwege Road, Ibanda
 Ishaka Branch: 44 Rukungiri Road, Ishaka
 Kabale Branch: 150/152 Kabale Road, Kabale
 Kabwohe Branch: 19B, Kabwohe Road, Kabwohe
 Kalangala Branch: Kalangala Main Street, Kalangala Town
 Kasese Branch: 27/31 Stanley Street, Kasese
 Kihihi Branch: 63 Block 74 Kinkizi, Kihihi Town
 Kisoro Branch: M5 Block 29 Kisoro–Kabale Road, Kisoro Town
 Kyotera Branch: 32 Masaka Road, Kyotera 
 Lyantonde Branch: 200 Block 76 Masaka–Mbarara Road, Lyantonde
 Masaka Branch: 4 Birch Avenue, Masaka
 Masindi Branch: 29/33 Tongue Street, Masindi
 Mbarara Branch: 1/3 Ntare Road, Mbarara
 Mubende Branch: 2 Block 13 Main Street, Mubende
 Ntungamo Branch: 33 Mbarara–Kabale Road, Ntungamo Township
 Rukungiri Branch: 123 Block 5 Kagunga, Rukungiri 
 Bwera Customer Service Point: Saad Village, Mpondwe–Lubiriha Road, Bwera Town 
 Kaboong Customer Service Point: 20 Kaabong Central West Road, Kaabong Trading Centre
 Kayunga Customer Service Point: 472 Block 123 Kayunga Road, Kayunga
 Kagadi Customer Service Point: Mugenyi Street, Kagadi
 Kumi Customer Service Point: 2 Ngora Road , Kumi 
 Pakwach Customer Service Point: 94 Arua Road, Pakwach
 Kakira Customer Service Point: Kakira South Estate Road, Kakira
 Kinyara Customer Service Point: Kinyara Sugar Estate, Kinyara 
 Mayuge Customer Service Point: Bukoba Road, Mayuge Town
 Wobulenzi Customer Service Point: 59 Block 159 Bulemezi, Kampala–Gulu Highway, Wobulenzi Trading Centre.

Certification
In June 2022, Stanbic Bank Uganda became the first commercial bank in the country, to be awarded the ISO/IEC 27001:2013 Certification, by the British Standards Institution. The certification is in recognition of the bank's Information Security Management Systems "compliance with global standards".

See also

 Standard Bank of South Africa
 Banking in Uganda
 Economy of Uganda
 List of banks in Uganda
 List of tallest buildings in Kampala

References

External links
 Website of Stanbic Bank Uganda Limited
 Uganda Securities Exchange
 Standard Bank Group Website

Banks of Uganda
Standard Bank Group
Companies based in Kampala
Banks established in 1906
1906 establishments in Uganda
South Africa–Uganda relations
Companies listed on the Uganda Securities Exchange